L'Oréal Professionnel is a brand of the professional products division of L'Oréal Group.
 
L'Oréal Professionnel offers a range of professional hair color, forme, styling and home haircare products. The products are divided into two categories: in-salon and home care products. Twice a year, L'Oréal Professionnel organizes the Color Collections, major events that contribute to making hairstyles an essential part of fashion marketing.

References

External links 
 L'Oréal Professionnel Official site

L'Oréal brands
Hair care products
Hair coloring